Betahistine, sold under the brand name Serc among others, is an anti-vertigo medication. It is commonly prescribed for balance disorders or to alleviate vertigo symptoms. It was first registered in Europe in 1970 for the treatment of Ménière's disease but current evidence does not support its efficacy in treating it.

Medical uses
Betahistine was once believed to have some positive effects in the treatment of Ménière's disease and vertigo but more recent evidence casts doubt over its efficacy.  There have been studies of the use of betahistine which showed a reduction in symptoms of vertigo and to a lesser extent, tinnitus, in subjects, but conclusive evidence is lacking at present. 

Oral betahistine has been approved for the treatment of Ménière’s disease and vestibular vertigo in more than 80 countries worldwide, and has been reportedly prescribed more than 130 million patients. However, betahistine has not been approved for marketing in the United States for the past few decades, and there is disagreement about its efficacy. 

The Cochrane Library concluded in 2001 that “Most trials suggested a reduction of vertigo with betahistine and some suggested a reduction in tinnitus but all these effects may have been caused by bias in the methods. One trial with good methods showed no effect of betahistine on tinnitus compared with placebo in 35 patients. None of the trials showed any effect of betahistine on hearing loss. No serious adverse effects were found with betahistine.”

Betahistine is also undergoing clinical trials for the treatment of attention deficit hyperactivity disorder (ADHD).

Contraindications
Betahistine is contraindicated for patients with pheochromocytoma. Patients with bronchial asthma or a history of peptic ulcer need to be closely monitored.

Side effects
Patients taking betahistine may experience following side effects:

 Headache
 Low level of gastric side effects
 Nausea can be a side effect, but the patient is generally already experiencing nausea due to the vertigo so it goes largely unnoticed.
 Patients taking betahistine may experience several hypersensitivity and allergic reactions. In the November 2006 issue of "Drug Safety," Dr. Sabine Jeck-Thole and Dr. Wolfgang Wagner reported that betahistine may cause several allergic and skin-related side effects. These include rash in several areas of the body; itching and hives; and swelling of the face, tongue and mouth. Other hypersensitivity reactions reported include tingling, numbness, burning sensations, shortness of breath and laboured breathing. The study authors suggest that hypersensitivity reactions may be a direct result of betahistine's role in increasing histamine levels throughout the body. Hypersensitivity reactions quickly subside after betahistine has been discontinued.

Digestive
Betahistine may also cause several digestive-related side effects. The package insert for Serc, a trade name for betahistine, states that patients may experience several gastrointestinal side effects. These may include nausea, upset stomach, vomiting, diarrhea, dry mouth and stomach cramping. These symptoms are usually not serious and subside between doses. Patients experiencing chronic digestive problems may lower their dose to the minimum effective range and by taking betahistine with meals. Additional digestive problems may require that patients consult their physician in order to find a possible suitable alternative.

Others
People taking betahistine may experience several other side effects ranging from mild to serious. The package insert for Serc states that patients may experience nervous-system side effects, including headache. Some nervous system events may also partly be attributable to the underlying condition rather than the medication used to treat it. The study by Jeck-Thole and Wagner also reports that patients may experience headache and liver problems, including increased liver enzymes and bile-flow disturbances. Any side effects that persist or outweigh the relief of symptoms of the original condition may warrant that the patient consult their physician to adjust or change the medication.

Pharmacology

Pharmacodynamics
Betahistine is a strong antagonist of the histamine H3 receptor and a weak agonist of the histamine H1 receptor.

Betahistine has two mechanisms of action. Primarily, it is a weak agonist on the H1 receptors located on blood vessels in the inner ear. This gives rise to local vasodilation and increased permeability, which helps to reverse the underlying problem of endolymphatic hydrops.

More importantly, betahistine has a powerful antagonistic effects at H3 receptors, thereby increasing the levels of neurotransmitters histamine, acetylcholine, norepinephrine, serotonin, and GABA released from the nerve endings. The increased amounts of histamine released from histaminergic nerve endings can stimulate receptors. This stimulation explains the potent vasodilatory effects of betahistine in the inner ear, that are well documented.

Betahistine seems to dilate the blood vessels within the inner ear which can relieve pressure from excess fluid and act on the smooth muscle.

It is postulated that betahistine's increase in the level of serotonin in the brainstem inhibits the activity of vestibular nuclei.

Pharmacokinetics
Betahistine comes in both a tablet form as well as an oral solution, and is taken orally. It is rapidly and completely absorbed. The mean plasma elimination half-life is 3 to 4 hours, and excretion is virtually complete in the urine within 24 hours. Plasma protein binding is very low. Betahistine is transformed into aminoethylpyridine and hydroxyethylpyridine and excreted with the urine as pyridylacetic acid. There is some evidence that one of these metabolites, aminoethylpyridine, may be active and exert effects similar to those of betahistine on ampullar receptors.

Chemistry
Betahistine chemically is 2-[2-(methylamino)ethyl]pyridine, and is formulated as the dihydrochloride salt. Its chemical structure closely resembles those of phenethylamine and histamine.

Society and culture

Brand names
Betahistine is marketed under a number of brand names, including Veserc, Serc, Hiserk, Betaserc, and Vergo.

Availability
Betahistine is widely used and available in Europe, including in the United Kingdom. It was approved by the Food and Drug Administration in the early 1970s for Ménière's disease, but approval was later withdrawn for lack of evidence of efficacy. The withdrawal was upheld by a US court of appeals in 1968.

See also
 2-Pyridylethylamine

References

Amines
H3 receptor antagonists
Histamine agonists
2-Pyridyl compounds
Vasodilators